Chamzey Rural District is a rural district (dehestan) in the Central District of Malekshahi County, Ilam Province, Iran. At the 2006 census, its population was 3,152, in 614 families.  The rural district has 10 villages.

References 

Rural Districts of Ilam Province
Malekshahi County